Mohéli Bandar Es Salam Airport  is an airport in Mohéli, Comoros. It is the third largest airport in Comoros after Prince Said Ibrahim International and Anjouan.

Airlines and destinations

References

External links
 
 

Mohéli
Airports in the Comoros